Abby Ann Arthur Johnson is a writer and educator.

She worked at Howard University's English department. She has written books with Ronald Maberry Johnson, who has taught at Georgetown University's history department. They wrote books about African American magazines and the Congressional Cemetery. She has written articles on Jessie Redmon Fauset and the Harlem Renaissance as well as Margaret C. Anderson and the Little Review.

Work 
The Johnsons' book Propaganda and Aesthetics: the Literary Politics of Afro-American Magazines in the Twentieth Century examined the history of Afro-American magazines.

In 2012, the Johnsons published In The Shadow of the United States Capitol: Congressional Cemetery and the Memory of the Nation detailed the history of the Congressional Cemetery.

Writings

Books
Propaganda and Aesthetics: the Literary Politics of Afro-American Magazines in the Twentieth Century by Abby Arthur Johnson and Ronald Maberry Johnson, University of Massachusetts Press 1979
In The Shadow of the United States Capitol: Congressional Cemetery and the Memory of the Nation with Ronald Maberry Johnson 2012

Articles
1973 doctoral dissertation at the University of Michigan
"The Promise of Baptism: Art Introduction to Baptism in Scripture and the Reformed Tradition" 1976
"Literary Midwife: Jessie Redmon Fauset and the Harlem Renaissance"
"Forgotten Pages: Black Literary Magazines in the 1920s" Journal of American Studies 1974 and published online by Cambridge University Press:  16 January 2009
"The Personal Magazine: Margaret C. Anderson and the Little Review, 1914–1929"

References

Historians of African Americans
Howard University faculty
Georgetown University faculty
Year of birth missing (living people)
Living people